Blenke House, on Stonehouse Rd. near Camp Springs, Kentucky, was built in c.1870.  It was listed on the National Register of Historic Places in 1983.

References

Houses on the National Register of Historic Places in Kentucky
Houses completed in 1870
National Register of Historic Places in Campbell County, Kentucky
1870 establishments in Kentucky
Houses in Campbell County, Kentucky